Pierre Kalala Mukendi (22 November 1939 – 30 June 2015) was a Congolese football forward, born in Likasi, who played internationally for Congo-Kinshasa and also played for TP Engelbert called now TP Mazembe.

Honours

With TP Engelbert
 Linafoot champion in 1966, 1967, 1969
 Coupe du Congo winner in 1966, 1967
African Cup of Champions Clubs winners in 1967, 1968
African Cup of Champions Clubs runners-up in 1969, 1970
African Cup Winners' Cup winners in 1980 (as manager)

With the RD Congo national team
 1968 African Cup of Nations champion in Ethiopia

References

External links

1939 births
2015 deaths
Africa Cup of Nations-winning players
Democratic Republic of the Congo footballers
Democratic Republic of the Congo international footballers
Association football forwards
Belgian Congo people
TP Mazembe players
1965 African Cup of Nations players
1968 African Cup of Nations players
People from Likasi
TP Mazembe managers
Democratic Republic of the Congo football managers
1992 African Cup of Nations managers
1994 African Cup of Nations managers